Cai Weiyan (born 25 October 1973 in Anhui) is a retired athlete who specialised in the pole vault. She won the bronze medal at the 1997 World Indoor Championships and the silver at the 1997 Summer Universiade.

Her personal bests are 4.33 metres outdoors (Shenzhen 1996) and 4.35 metres indoors (Paris 1997).

Competition record

References

1973 births
Living people
Chinese female pole vaulters
Athletes (track and field) at the 1998 Asian Games
Universiade medalists in athletics (track and field)
Athletes from Anhui
Asian Games medalists in athletics (track and field)
Asian Games gold medalists for China
Medalists at the 1998 Asian Games
Universiade silver medalists for China
Medalists at the 1997 Summer Universiade